The 1920 Santa Clara Missionites football team was an American football team that represented Santa Clara University as an independent during the 1920 college football season.  In their second and final season under head coach Robert E. Harmon, the team compiled a 5–1 record, shut out three of six opponents, and outscored all opponents by a total of 141 to 55.

Coach Harmon also coached other sports at Santa Clara. In June 1920, he left his coaching position at Santa Clara to join a law firm in Illinois.

Schedule

References

Santa Clara
Santa Clara Broncos football seasons
Santa Clara Missionites football